Skynet 5D is a military communications satellite operated by Airbus Defence and Space on behalf of the British Ministry of Defence. It was the last of four Skynet 5 satellites to be launched.

Spacecraft 
The Skynet 5D spacecraft was constructed by Astrium, based on the Eurostar 3000S satellite bus. Its  solar arrays will generate a minimum of 6 kilowatts to power its UHF and X-band communications systems. The satellite's payload includes jamming countermeasures.

The Ministry of Defence described the satellite as having a "key role in gathering intelligence on operations", as well as communications.

Launch 
Skynet 5D was launched by an Ariane 5ECA carrier rocket flying from ELA-3 at Kourou. The launch occurred at 21:49 UTC on 19 December 2012. Skynet 5D was one of two satellites aboard the rocket, the other being Mexsat Bicentenario, which was located below it; Skynet 5D was mounted atop a Sylda 5 adaptor.

Orbit 
The launch placed Skynet 5D into a geosynchronous transfer orbit, from which was planned to raise itself into geostationary orbit. The spacecraft was expected to be placed at a longitude of 25 degrees East.

References

Military satellites
Satellites of the United Kingdom
Spacecraft launched in 2012
Satellites using the Eurostar bus
Spacecraft launched by Ariane rockets